The 2019 Spa-Francorchamps FIA Formula 3 round was a motor racing event held on 31 August and 1 September 2019 at the Circuit de Spa-Francorchamps, Stavelot, Belgium. It was the sixth round of the 2019 FIA Formula 3 Championship, and ran in support of the 2019 Belgian Grand Prix.

Classification

Qualifying 
The Qualifying session took place on 30 August 2019, with Jehan Daruvala scoring pole position.

Race 1

Race 2

See also 

 2019 Belgian Grand Prix
 2019 Spa-Francorchamps Formula 2 round

References

External links 
Official website

|- style="text-align:center"
|width="35%"|Previous race:
|width="30%"|FIA Formula 3 Championship2019 season
|width="40%"|Next race:

2019 FIA Formula 3 Championship
2019 in Belgian motorsport
2019 in motorsport